Events in the year 2021 in Iceland.

Incumbents 

 President: Guðni Th. Jóhannesson
 Prime Minister: Katrín Jakobsdóttir
 Althing: 2017-present Althing
 Speaker of the Althing: Steingrímur J. Sigfússon
 President of the Supreme Court: Karl Axelsson

Events 

 Ongoing — COVID-19 pandemic in Iceland
 25 September – The parliamentary election for the Althing.

Deaths 

 1 January - Ágúst Herbert Guðmundsson, basketball player (b. 1967)
 18 January – Svavar Gestsson, politician (b. 1944)
 24 January - Jóhannes Eðvaldsson, (b. 1950)
 14 June - Gunnar Birgisson, (b. 1947)
 9 July - Þórunn Egilsdóttir, (b. 1964)
 10 September - Jón Sigurðsson, (b. 1946)
 16 September - Vilborg Dagbjartsdóttir, (b. 1930)
 11 December - Fjölnir Geir Bragason, tattoo artist (b.1965)
 14 December - María Guðmundsdóttir, (b. 1935)
 22 December - Egill Skúli Ingibergsson, (b. 1926)

References 

 
2020s in Iceland
Years of the 21st century in Iceland
Iceland
Iceland